In graph theory, a domatic partition of a graph  is a partition of  into disjoint sets , ,..., such that each Vi is a dominating set for G. The figure on the right shows a domatic partition of a graph; here the dominating set  consists of the yellow vertices,  consists of the green vertices, and  consists of the blue vertices.

The domatic number is the maximum size of a domatic partition, that is, the maximum number of disjoint dominating sets. The graph in the figure has domatic number 3. It is easy to see that the domatic number is at least 3 because we have presented a domatic partition of size 3. To see that the domatic number is at most 3, we first review a simple upper bound.

Upper bounds

Let  be the minimum degree of the graph . To see this, consider a vertex  of degree . Therefore, there are at most  disjoint dominating sets.

The graph in the figure has minimum degree , and therefore its domatic number is at most 3. Hence we have shown that its domatic number is exactly 3; the figure shows a maximum-size domatic partition.

Lower bounds

If there is no isolated vertex in the graph (that is,  ≥ 1), then the domatic number is at least 2. To see this, note that (1) a weak 2-coloring is a domatic partition if there is no isolated vertex, and (2) any graph has a weak 2-coloring. Alternatively, (1) a maximal independent set is a dominating set, and (2) the complement of a maximal independent set is also a dominating set if there are no isolated vertices.

The figure on the right shows a weak 2-coloring, which is also a domatic partition of size 2: the dark nodes are a dominating set, and the light nodes are another dominating set (the light nodes form a maximal independent set). See weak coloring for more information.

Computational complexity

Finding a domatic partition of size 1 is trivial: let . Finding a domatic partition of size 2 (or determining that it does not exist) is easy: check if there are isolated nodes, and if not, find a weak 2-coloring.

However, finding a maximum-size domatic partition is computationally hard. Therefore, the problem of determining the domatic number of a given graph is NP-hard, and the problem of finding a maximum-size domatic partition is NP-hard as well.

There is a polynomial-time approximation algorithm with a logarithmic approximation guarantee, that is, it is possible to find a domatic partition whose size is within a factor  of the optimum.

However, under plausible complexity-theoretic assumptions, there is no polynomial-time approximation algorithm with a sub-logarithmic approximation factor. More specifically, a polynomial-time approximation algorithm for domatic partition with the approximation factor  for a constant  would imply that all problems in NP can be solved in slightly super-polynomial time .

Comparison with similar concepts
 Domatic partition
 Partition of vertices into disjoint dominating sets. The domatic number is the maximum number of such sets.
 Vertex coloring
 Partition of vertices into disjoint independent sets. The chromatic number is the minimum number of such sets.
 Clique partition
 Partition of vertices into disjoint cliques. Equal to vertex coloring in the complement graph.
 Edge coloring
 Partition of edges into disjoint matchings. The edge chromatic number is the minimum number of such sets.

Let G = (U ∪ V, E) be a bipartite graph without isolated nodes; all edges are of the form {u, v} ∈ E with u ∈ U and v ∈ V. Then {U, V} is both a vertex 2-coloring and a domatic partition of size 2; the sets U and V are independent dominating sets. The chromatic number of G is exactly 2; there is no vertex 1-coloring. The domatic number of G is at least 2. It is possible that there is a larger domatic partition; for example, the complete bipartite graph Kn,n for any n ≥ 2 has domatic number n.

Notes

References
. A1.1: GT3, p. 190.
.

Graph invariants
NP-complete problems
Computational problems in graph theory